was a Japanese bureaucrat, politician and cabinet minister in the Taishō and early Shōwa periods  of the Japan.

Biography
Katsu was born in Fukuoka Prefecture, as the eldest son of a samurai retainer of Kokura Domain. He graduated with a law degree from Tokyo Imperial University in 1905, after which he worked as a bureaucrat at the Ministry of Finance, and was assigned to various local and regional tax offices and customs offices in the course of his career.

In 1928, Katsu was elected in the Japanese general election of 1928 to the lower house of the Diet of Japan, under the Rikken Minseitō party. He was reelected six times to the same seat. In 1928, he was appointed Parliamentary Under-Secretary for Finance under the Hamaguchi administration and Vice-Minister for Commerce and Industry under the Okada administration in 1934. In January 1940, he was appointed Communications Minister in the Yonai administration
.
An early supporter of the Imperial Rule Assistance Association, he was chairman of General Affairs. After the surrender of Japan, he was one of the members of the short-lived Japan Progressive Party (Shinpo-tō) led by Inukai Takeru. However, in 1946 he was purged from public office by the American occupation authorities.

References

External links

19th-century births
1957 deaths
People from Fukuoka Prefecture
Rikken Minseitō politicians
Imperial Rule Assistance Association politicians
Members of the House of Representatives (Empire of Japan)
University of Tokyo alumni
Government ministers of Japan
Politicians from Fukuoka Prefecture